Noord is a hamlet in the Dutch province of North Brabant. It is located in the municipality of Sint Anthonis, about 1 km west of Wanroij.

References

Populated places in North Brabant